The University of Salerno (UNISA) is a university located in Fisciano and in Baronissi, Italy. Its main campus is located in Fisciano while the Faculty of Medicine is located in Baronissi. It is organized in ten faculties.

History
Salerno's Schola Medica Salernitana was the most important medical school in Europe between the 10th and 13th centuries. Following the rise of university medical schools, it briefly merged with the University of Naples, which moved to Salerno from 1253 to 1258 before returning to Naples and establishing its own medical school there. Meanwhile, the University of Montpellier displaced Salerno as the most prestigious medical school internationally and by the 14th century the latter had ceased to exist.
The modern University of Salerno traces its origin to the Istituto Universitario di Magistero “Giovanni Cuomo”, a teacher training college founded in 1944 with this renowned and ancient tradition in mind. In 1968 the institute became a State university, the University of Salerno, and it has since seen a great increase in student numbers.

Organization
The University of Salerno offers degrees in 10 faculties:

 Faculty of Arts and Philosophy
 Faculty of Economics
 Faculty of Education
 Faculty of Engineering
 Faculty of Foreign language and literature
 Faculty of Law
 Faculty of Medicine
 Faculty of Mathematics, Physics and Natural Sciences
 Faculty of Pharmacy
 Faculty of Political Science

The library "biblioteca Eduardo R. Caianiello" offers students over 400,000 volumes and constitutes one of the major collections of books in Italy.

ICSR Mediterranean Knowledge 
In May 2015 the University of Salerno saw the establishment of a new research institute,  the International Centre for Studies and Research "Mediterranean Knowledge", composed by 14 Research Units located in universities of the Mediterranean countries. The ICSR, that has its administrative office at the University of Salerno, aims at favouring research and dissemination of knowledge about the most important topics of the Mediterranean Basin. For that purpose it publishes the book series Mediterranean, Knowledge, Culture, Heritage,  theJournal of Mediterranean Knowledge and a series of Working Papers. 
The ICSR, moreover, periodically organizes national and international conferences.

See also
 List of Italian universities
 Salerno
 Schola Medica Salernitana

References

External links

 University of Salerno Website

 
University
University
Educational institutions established in 1944
1944 establishments in Italy